"Scream" is a song recorded by South Korean girl group 2NE1. It was released through YGEX alongside the group's Japanese compilation album Collection on March 28, 2012, and marked the first and only original Japanese song by the group. "Scream" serves as the second single promoted off the record after "Go Away", which was released in November 2011. A remix of the song by M-Flo was released digitally on Recochoku on March 14, 2012, before the single itself was released on March 28. A recording of "Scream" in Korean was included on the tracklist of 2NE1's second studio album Crush, which was released in February 2014.

Editions
The single was released in three different versions, two limited CD & DVD editions and a regular CD only. First press edition come with a sleeve cover and the regular edition also includes a 22-page booklet consisting of pictures of the group and lyrics to "Scream" and "Fire". Type A's DVD contains the music video of the title track "Scream", the making of the music video and exclusive footage of 2NE1 in the Philippines. Type B comes with various footage from Season 3 of "2NE1TV" and is approximately 30 minutes long.

Commercial performance
The song is, to date, 2NE1's least successful Japanese single. Despite the song peaking at number 7 and selling 3,278 copies in the first day while their previous Japanese single, "Go Away", peaked at number 9, the song dropped off the Oricon Daily chart after 4 consecutive days of charting whereas "Go Away" charted for 7 days. The song debuted at number 18 on the Japan Hot 100. In 2014, the Korean version of the track peaked at number 17 on the Gaon Digital Chart for two consecutive weeks.

Track listing

Credits and personnel
 2NE1vocals, background vocals
 CLlyricist (Korean ver.)
 Verballyricist (Japanese ver.)
 Teddy Parklyricist, composer, arranger
 Future Bounce
 Dee.Pcomposer, arranger

Accolades

Charts

Daily and weekly charts

Monthly charts

Release history

References

External links
 2NE1 official site

2012 singles
2NE1 songs
Eurodance songs
Japanese-language songs
YG Entertainment singles
Songs written by Verbal (rapper)
2012 songs
Songs written by Teddy Park